"Chains" is a song by Australian singer Tina Arena from her third studio album, Don't Ask (1994). It was composed by Arena, Pam Reswick and Steve Werfel and produced by David Tyson. "Chains" peaked at number four on Australia's ARIA Singles Chart, reached number six in the United Kingdom, and charted well throughout Europe, earning her numerous awards in the process. The power ballad was also a hit in North America, peaking at number 38 on the US Billboard Hot 100 and number 20 on the Canadian RPM Top Singles chart. The track was re-released featuring Jessica Mauboy and the Veronicas following a rendition of the track at the 2015 ARIA Awards where Arena was inducted into the ARIA Hall of Fame.

Critical reception
The song received favorable reviews from most music critics. Scottish newspaper Aberdeen Press and Journal praised Arena's "stunning voice". AllMusic editor Kelvin Hayes called it a "stellar" "showcase single". Larry Flick from Billboard described it as a "immediately memorable, lyrically smart rhythm ballad" and added that "within an arrangement that smoothly builds from a subtle, finger-snappin' pop groove to a dramatic, rock-edged climax, Arena comes on strong with a voice that is a diva hybrid of Celine Dion, Mariah Carey, and Olivia Newton-John." James Richliano from The Boston Globe wrote that the singer "marries her powerhouse vocals to a smoky dance beat laced with edgy lyrics of a diva on the verge." A reviewer from Crawley News said the song is "brilliant".

In 2017, The Daily Telegraph listed it as one of 21 Best Power Ballads in 2017, describing it as a "smooth, sultry plea of a woman trapped in an unhealthy relationship". Jim Farber from Entertainment Weekly compared Arena to Mariah Carey, adding that she "sings in the same overwrought, corporate style as Carey." Evening Herald complimented the singer as "a singing sensation by six". Monica Tan from The Guardian deemed it a "glass-breaking love song". Pan-European magazine Music & Media commented, "Caged in a CD jewel box, but for how long? Since she's now a gold seller in her native Australia, and funky grooves are a game without frontiers by nature, you shouldn't sit back and wait." Alan Jones from Music Week called it "a beguiling introduction" to the Aussie songstress. People Magazine stated that "wrapped in the glow of love, she turns in a muscular vocal on this rhythmic power ballad, effortlessly stretching her octave-leaping soprano." They added that Arena "possesses some valuable vocal assets: the pitch-perfect clarity of Celine Dion and the girlish sensuality of early Olivia Newton-John."

Chart performance
"Chains" charted on the charts on several continents. In Europe, it was a Top 10 hit in Ireland, Scotland and the United Kingdom. In the latter, the single debuted at number 13 on the UK Singles Chart and peaked at number six in its fourth week on the chart, on April 30, 1995. Additionally, "Chains" reached the Top 20 in Poland, Top 30 in Iceland and Top 40 in Sweden. On the Eurochart Hot 100, it peaked at number 10 on May 6. Outside Europe, the song went to number 20 in Canada and number 38 on the Billboard Hot 100. In Arena's home country, Australia, it reached its best chart position as number four. And in New Zealand, the single also peaked within the Top 10, as number seven. It was awarded with a silver record in the United Kingdom, with a sale of 200,000 singles and a platinum record in Australia, with 70,000 units sold.

Music videos
There are two music videos for "Chains", an Australian version and a US version.

In the Australian music video for "Chains", Arena sits on the floor in a dark living room. The windows are covered with paper, though sunlight enters in a few places. The furniture is covered with white cloths. Occasionally, Arena stands by a window, looking out through a small opening. In the middle of the video, she tears down the paper from the windows and the cloths are removed from the furniture. In a room now fully lit, Arena opens a window and throws out menswear and various things from the apartment. She dances around and, as the video ends, smiles at the camera.

Track listings
Australian CD single
 "Chains" (Tina Arena, Pam Reswick, Steve Werfel) – 4:03
 "Standing Up" (Arena, Heather Field, Rick Price) – 3:37
 "Chains" (World Jeep Mix) (Arena, Reswick, Werfel) – 5:44
 "Chains" (World Jazz Mix) (Arena, Reswick, Werfel) – 5:05

UK CD single
 "Chains" (Arena, Reswick, Werfel) – 4:03
 "Standing Up" (Arena, Field, Price) – 3:37
 "Chains" (World Jazz Mix) (Arena, Reswick, Werfel) – 5:05

UK CD single (Part 2)
 "Chains" (Arena, Reswick, Werfel) – 4:26
 "Greatest Gift" (Acapella Version) (Arena, Robert Parde) – 4:21
 "Many Rivers to Cross" (Live Version) (Jimmy Cliff) – 4:33
 "Standing Up" (Arena, Field, Price) – 3:37

Charts and certifications

Weekly charts

Year-end charts

Certifications

Release history

2015 version featuring Jessica Mauboy and the Veronicas

"Chains" was rereleased on 27 November 2015 following a rendition of the track at the 2015 ARIA Awards where Arena was inducted into the ARIA Hall of Fame. The 2015 version features Jessica Mauboy and the Veronicas and was described by 2Day FM as the "highlight" of the Awards and one of the best ARIA performances. This version debuted at number 14 on the Australian Singles Chart, which was Arena's biggest hit on the singles chart in Australia since 2002.

Charts

References

1990s ballads
1994 singles
1994 songs
ARIA Award-winning songs
Columbia Records singles
Epic Records singles
Pop ballads
Songs written by Pam Reswick
Songs written by Tina Arena
Tina Arena songs
Songs written by Steve Werfel